Kylie / Fashion is a photo-book by Australian singer Kylie Minogue and English fashion designer William Baker. It was released on 12 November 2012 by Thames & Hudson.

Background
Kylie / Fashion celebrates Minogue's 25 years in pop music and numerous collaborations with some of the world's greatest fashion designers. It includes many images of Minogue as well as some rare and unseen photos, video stills and sketches. The book was curated by William Baker, Minogue's creative director, and introduced by Jean Paul Gaultier, the book also features specially written texts by some of the most important designers and stylists Minogue has worked with throughout her career, including Domenico Dolce and Stefano Gabbana, Christian Louboutin, Julien Macdonald, Stella McCartney, Laudomia Pucci, make-up artist Kabuki and photographer Stéphane Sednaoui. Minogue herself supplies additional commentary and an afterword.

According to Esquire magazine, the book is "crammed with high fashion images shot by elite photographers … a celebration of an international treasure, a woman loved for both her body of work and working her body".

Details
The book is 32 cm × 24 cm and its ISBN number is 9780500516652. It has 346 illustrations, 269 in colour, spread across 224 pages.

The images were reproduced by Rhapsody at their photography studio in Shoreditch utilising the latest colour management techniques.

References

2012 in fashion
2012 non-fiction books
Books of photographs
British non-fiction books
Kylie Minogue
Thames & Hudson books